The rufous-breasted accentor (Prunella strophiata) is passerine bird in the family Prunellidae, endemic to the Himalayas, descending in the winter to lower-to-middle altitudes. It is found in Afghanistan, Bhutan, Tibet, China, India, Myanmar, Nepal, and Pakistan.

Its natural habitat is temperate forest.

Taxonomy
The rufous-breasted accentor was described by the English zoologist Edward Blyth in 1843 from a specimen collected in Nepal. He coined the binomial name Accentor strophiatus. The specific epithet strophiatus/strophiata is from Latin strophium  "breast-band". The rufous-breasted accentor is now placed in the genus Prunella that was introduced by the French ornithologist Louis Vieillot in 1816.

Two subspecies are recognised:
 P. s. jerdoni (Brooks, WE, 1872) – east Afghanistan and west Himalayas
 P. s. strophiata (Blyth, 1843) – central and east Himalayas to central China and north Myanmar

References

External links
 Xeno-canto: audio recordings of the rufous-breasted accentor

rufous-breasted accentor
Birds of Afghanistan
Birds of China
Birds of the Himalayas
Birds of Nepal
Birds of Pakistan
Birds of Yunnan
rufous-breasted accentor
Taxonomy articles created by Polbot
rufous-breasted accentor